Zire Tigh (English translation: Under the Blade) is an Iranian drama television series that originally aired on the IRIB TV1 on October 31, 2006. The series contained 19 episodes, and was a popular success among the viewers. It aired on Wednesday nights after the nightly national news on IRIB TV1. The show was later re-run daily on IRIB 1, IRIB 2 and IRIB 3 for those living abroad. The show's finale aired on March 12, 2007.

Synopsis 
The show focuses on the lives of two close, yet torn apart by a tragic event families.
Mahmood and Jafar are two close working class friends who work with each other at a refrigerator manufacturing factory. Their families are also very close to each other, as Jafar's son is engaged to Mahmood's daughter.
Jafar's older brother Ghodrat, opposes the engagement. Ghodrat wants his daughter to marry Jafar's son. Ghodrat and his friends attempt to split up the two families in order to sabotage the engagement.
Mahmood, who is the head of the storage and inventory facility at the factory, is fired from his job after the allegations of the theft come up. Mahmood and Jafar get into a fight and Mahmood accidentally kills Jafar. This leads to a rift between the two families, including the engaged couple as well as other people close to Mahmoood and Jafar.

Cast 
The cast of Zire Tigh was considered to be one of its strong points. Parviz Parastui, Fatemeh Motamed-Arya and Atila Pesyani portray as four of the main characters in the series. Parastui's performance in particular was widely acclaimed.

Parviz Parastui as Mahmood Foroughi 
Fatemeh Motamed-Arya as Tahereh Foroughi': Mahmood's wife
Siavosh Tahmoures as Ghodrat Omidvar: Jafar's brother
Kourosh Tahami as Reza Omidvar: Jafar's son
Elham Hamidi as Maryam Foroughi: Mahmood and Tahereh's daughter
Atila Pesyani as Jafar Omidvar
Shabnam Moghaddami as Marziyeh
Tarlan Parvaneh as Mahmood's daughter
Ghazal Saremi as Ghodrat's daughter

Reception 
The show gained huge success by viewers. According to a survey conducted by the IRIB, more than 80% of those surveyed watched the show, and a large percentage of them claimed they were depressed as an outcome of watching. Additionally, viewers considered the performance of the actors as a strong point of the show and its often depressing plot was considered a negative.

References

External links 
 

Iranian television series
2000s Iranian television series
2006 Iranian television series debuts
2007 Iranian television series endings
Islamic Republic of Iran Broadcasting original programming
Persian-language television shows